R. L. Turner High School is a public high school located in Carrollton, Texas, (USA) in the Carrollton-Farmers Branch Independent School District. The school serves portions of Carrollton, Farmers Branch, and Addison.

In 2015, the school was rated "Met Standard" by the Texas Education Agency.

Athletics

The Turner Lions compete in the following sports:

Baseball
Basketball
Cross Country
Football
Golf
Powerlifting
Soccer
Softball
Swimming and Diving
Tennis
Track and Field
Volleyball
Wrestling

Soccer
The Turner soccer team won the District 18-AAAA Championship in 2009 and 2011.

Notable alumni
George Dunham, radio personality
Henry Godinez, Noted Latino theater director and writer
Bridget Hall, Top Model
Andrew Magee, PGA Tour member, has 4 tournament wins and is the only one on the PGA to have a hole-in-one on a par four
Kenny Marchant, Representative for Texas's 24th congressional district
Bill Montgomery, All District Quarterback and All-Southwest Conference quarterback at the University of Arkansas from 1968-1970
Keith Moreland, famed Major League Baseball standout and University of Texas broadcaster (All-America in baseball and played football at UT), a former analyst on Chicago Cubs Radio Network. 
Judy Trammell, head choreographer for the Dallas Cowboys Cheerleaders
Vanilla Ice, rapper famous for his hit song Ice Ice Baby.

References

http://rlt.cfbisd.edu/news.php

External links
 

Public high schools in Texas
Educational institutions established in 1963
Public high schools in Dallas County, Texas
Schools in Carrollton, Texas
Carrollton-Farmers Branch Independent School District high schools
1963 establishments in Texas